Frederick Earp (27 October 1841 – 8 August 1928) was a New Zealand goldminer, farmer, surveyor and market gardener. He was born in Kidderminster, Worcestershire, England on 27 October 1841.

References

1841 births
1928 deaths
New Zealand farmers
New Zealand miners
New Zealand surveyors